Kerlaz is a commune in the Finistère department of Brittany in northwestern France. 
It extends over an area of 11.39 km2. In 2017 the commune had 799 inhabitants (density: 69.8 inhabitants/km2).

Population
Inhabitants of Kerlaz are called in French Kerlaziens.

See also
Communes of the Finistère department

References

External links

Mayors of Finistère Association ;

Communes of Finistère